Livadeia B.C. (alternate spellings: Livadia) was a Greek professional basketball club. The club was located in Livadeia, Greece. The team competed in the Greek 2nd Division. The club was also commonly known as A.E. Leivadeias, or A.E.L.

History
The A.E. Livadeia parent sports athletic association was founded in 1994. The sport club's basketball department, Livadeia B.C., was founded in 1994. In 2013, the club returned to the Greek B League (Betta Ethniki), and the next season, it was promoted for the first time to the Greek 2nd Division.

In 2016, the club was merged with Holargos.

Notable players 

  Giannis Giannopoulos
  Ioannis Gagaloudis

Head coaches 
  Nikos Oikonomou

External links
Eurobasket.com Team Profile

Basketball teams in Greece
Basketball teams established in 1994